Al-Batnah is a sub-district located in Al Ashah District, 'Amran Governorate, Yemen. Al-Batnah had a population of 3304 according to the 2004 census.

References 

Sub-districts in Al Ashah District